DeWitt Nunatak is a nunatak,  high, along the face of an ice escarpment  west of Snake Ridge, in the Patuxent Range, Pensacola Mountains. It was mapped by the United States Geological Survey from surveys and from U.S. Navy air photos, 1956–66, and was named by the Advisory Committee on Antarctic Names for Steven R. DeWitt, a meteorologist at Palmer Station, winter 1966.

References 

Nunataks of Queen Elizabeth Land